Keosayan is an Armenian surname. Notable people with the surname include:

Edmond Keosayan (1936–1994), Armenian Soviet film director and musician
Tigran Keosayan (born 1966), Russian-Armenian film director, actor and writer, son of Edmond

Armenian-language surnames